Cinderella (Marathi: सिंड्रेला) is a 2015 Indian Marathi language drama film directed by Kiran Nakti and produced by Anjali Avinash Joshi. It is Nakti's debut as a film director.  The film stars Rupesh Bane, Yashaswi Vengurlekar, Mangesh Desai and Sajida Khan in lead roles and was released on 4 December 2015 in India.

Cast 
 Atharva Nakti
 Rupesh Bane
 Yashaswi Vengurlekar
 Mangesh Desai
 Janardan Parab
 Yakub Sayed
 Vineet Bhonde

Plot 
The movie is based on two orphan children from the slum area of Mumbai. Cinderella is a fantasy of a little girl.

Soundtrack 

The soundtrack of Cinderella consists of 5 songs, of which 3 were composed by Kiran Vehale - Gaurav Murkar while 2 were composed by Pankaj Padghan.

Critical reception

Marathi Cineyug gave the film a rating of 3 out of 5 saying that, "‘Cinderella’ is a story of courage and overcoming the hardship of being poor, but still dreaming of a better life and being happy all the time. Above all this is a story of fulfilling one’s dreams through all hardship, a real Cinderella moment." Rasik Tirodkar of Marathi Stars gave the film a rating of 2 out of 5 saying that, "It can for the most parts be labelled as poverty porn. Melodrama in addition to some weak acting makes this film a pretty bad watch."

References 

2015 films
2010s Marathi-language films